The 11th presidential election of India was held on 17 July 1997. With 956,290 votes, K. R. Narayanan overcame his nearest rival T. N. Seshan who received 50,631 votes. Narayanan was the first dalit to be elected President of India.

Results

References

External links
Election Commission of India Official Site

1997 elections in India
Presidential elections in India